The Beijing Science and Technology University Gymnasium is an indoor arena located on the campus of the University of Science and Technology Beijing. The venue covers an area of 2.38 hectares and the total floor space of construction reaches 24,662 square metres. The seating capacity is 8,024 seats, including 3,956 temporary ones. It consists of a main gym and a comprehensive facility. Construction started in October 2005 and was completed in August 2007.

During the 2008 Summer Olympics, it hosted the judo and taekwondo matches. During the 2008 Summer Paralympics, it hosted the preliminary rounds of wheelchair basketball and the wheelchair rugby competition.

After the Olympic Games, the gymnasium turned into a complex to host sport competitions, live performances, and cultural activities. It will also continue to serve the campus.

References
 Official website

Venues of the 2008 Summer Olympics
Indoor arenas in China
Sports venues in Beijing
Olympic judo venues
Olympic taekwondo venues
University sports venues in China